Protein RFT1 homolog is a protein that in humans is encoded by the RFT1 gene.

Defects are associated with congenital disorder of glycosylation type 1N.

See also
 Flippase

References

Further reading

External links
  GeneReviews/NCBI/NIH/UW entry on Congenital Disorders of Glycosylation Overview